Canada–Israel relations refer to the bilateral diplomatic, commercial, and cultural ties between Canada and the State of Israel. Canada recognised Israel on 11 May 1949, three day before the first anniversary of the Israeli Declaration of Independence, and currently maintains an embassy in Tel Aviv; Israel maintains an embassy in Ottawa and regional consulates in Montreal and Toronto.

Early history 

In the 1930s, as tensions rose between the Arab and Jewish populations of Mandatory Palestine, restrictions were placed by the British authorities on Jewish immigration to the region. During this time, Canadian prime minister Mackenzie King, who has been accused of harbouring latent anti-Semitism during his lifetime, passively accepted the British anti-immigration policies in the Mandate. In general, the immigration of Jews to the Holy Land was not met with opposition or concern in Canada; however, institutions and groups such as the Roman Catholic Church in Quebec expressed hostility toward Jews and Zionism, largely on the basis of existing theological prejudices.

In 1947, as a representative on the United Nations Special Committee on Palestine (UNSCOP), Canada was among the 33 countries that voted in favour of the Partition Plan for Palestine, which aimed to split the British Mandate into an Arab state and a Jewish state with an internationalised Jerusalem. Despite heavy pressure from the United Kingdom on the Commonwealth of Nations to abstain during the vote, the Partition Plan was adopted by the United Nations General Assembly with a majority of the representatives in favour. While the Partition Plan could not be implemented as intended due to the outbreak of a civil war in the territory, the State of Israel emerged with an agreed border by 1949.

Canada granted de facto recognition to Israel in December 1948 and full de jure recognition on 11 May 1949 after the Jewish state was admitted into the United Nations as a member state. One week later, Avraham Harman was appointed as Israel's first Consul-General to Canada. In September 1953, a Canadian embassy was opened in Tel Aviv, and Michael Comay was appointed as the Israeli ambassador to Canada; a Canadian ambassador to Israel was appointed in 1958.

The Embassy of Israel in Canada is located at 50 O'Connor Street in Ottawa. Israel also operates regional consulates in Montreal and Toronto.

Diplomatic relations (1948–1990) 

In May 1961, David Ben-Gurion was the first Israeli Prime Minister to make an official visit to Canada. Since then, officials from both countries have made frequent trips. Members of Parliament, Cabinet Ministers and Justices of the Supreme Court of Canada have visited, Israel demonstrating the ever strengthening relationship and cooperation. In addition, the premiers of Manitoba, Prince Edward Island, Ontario and Alberta and cabinet ministers from other provinces, have led successful commercial and cultural missions to Israel. A number of Canadian municipalities are twinning with Israeli cities.
In 1957, after the Sinai Campaign, Lester Pearson, the Secretary of State for External Affairs, received the Nobel Peace Prize for successfully leading the process by which UN peace keeping troops were stationed along the border between Israel and Egypt. Canadian troops also played a central role in the United Nations Emergency Force (UNEF). This role is part of the wider Canadian commitment to efforts designed to end the Arab-Israel conflict.  Later, in the late 1970s, Canada encouraged the peace negotiations between Israeli Prime Minister Menachem Begin and Egyptian President Anwar Sadat, and Begin stopped in Canada and met with Prime Minister Pierre Trudeau in 1977.

In general, while diplomatic relations were cordial, they were not particularly close during this period. A number of Canadian diplomats, like their European counterparts, tended to support the Arab positions against Israel in the United Nations and other frameworks. The Canadian Arabists, such as Ambassador Michael D. Bell, sought to align policy with the Arab states in order to promote commercial interests, and to gain Arab support for Canadian candidates and positions, in the United Nations. These positions generated considerable friction with Israel, and were criticised as a departure from Canadian moral policies.

Diplomatic relations (1990–present) 
Canada's support for Israel received strong public endorsement during the Gulf War, during which Iraqi missiles were fired into Israel from occupied Kuwait. Canadian forces were part of the United States-led coalition against Ba'athist Iraq during this time.

In the multilateral negotiations that took place after the 1991 Madrid Conference, Canada agreed to head the multilateral working group on Palestinian refugee issues. Although a number of meetings were held and different options were discussed, no agreements were reached. In 1995, the multilateral talks reached an impasse.

With the election of Stephen Harper's government in 2006, the relationship between Canada and Israel strengthened considerably. The Harper government played a direct role in forming policy for the region, seeking to adjust the positions to be in conformity with the principles of the Conservative majority. Consequently, diplomats who promoted anti-Israel or Arabist policies lost influence.

As anti-Israel political movements spread to Canada, including at university campuses through events such as Israeli Apartheid Week (IAW), Canadian government officials and members of parliament from different parties expressed opposition. In 2010, Conservative MP Tim Uppal introduced a motion in the Canadian House of Commons that condemned IAW "for seeking to delegitimize the State of Israel by equating it with the racist South African apartheid regime." NDP and Bloc Québécois members refused to agree to its unanimous passage. The Bloc submitted its own motion, which also criticised use of the word "apartheid" but added a clause, stating not every criticism of Israel is anti-Semitic. The result was that all parties, with the exception of some NDP members, denounced Israeli Apartheid Week.

On April 29, 2009, to mark the 61st anniversary of the State of Israel, PM Stephen Harper said "We count ourselves among Israel's closest partners. Since its founding in 1948, Canada has supported Israel and its right to live in peace and security with its neighbours. We value this relationship and look forward to continued friendship and collaboration."

In a magazine interview published February 12, 2010, Environment Minister Peter Kent said: "Prime Minister Harper has made it quite clear for some time now and has regularly stated that an attack on Israel would be considered an attack on Canada."

In 2013, Vivian Bercovici from Toronto was appointed as the Canadian Ambassador to Israel, and she served until June 2016.

Following the return of the Liberal Party to power under Prime Minister Justin Trudeau in 2015, relations between Canada and Israel remained largely unchanged. In September 2016, Trudeau headed the Canadian delegation to the state funeral of Israeli leader Shimon Peres, and in his condolence message, stated: "Mr. Peres was an internationally-respected statesman and a great friend to Canada. He visited our country often, and helped build relations that remain strong to this day."

Canada, Israel, and the United Nations 
Canada's activities and policies in the United Nations arena are generally a major expression of and component of its foreign policy, and the issues surrounding Israel receive disproportionate attention in the UN, due largely to the hostility of the Arab League and the Organisation of Islamic Cooperation, which form the largest voting bloc in the international body. In 1947, Canada was represented on the United Nations Special Committee on Palestine (UNSCOP), and was among the 33 countries that voted in favour of the 1947 UN partition resolution, which led to the establishment of the State of Israel.

However, in order to avoid conflict and criticism from the oil-rich Arab countries, and reflecting the advice of the Arabists among the Canadian diplomatic corps, such as Michael D Bell for many years, Canada either abstained or joined in voting against the numerous anti-Israel resolutions, in contrast to the United States, which voted with Israel. For many In the 1990s, the friction between Canada and Israel increased over this issue.

This policy changed under the Harper government, which voted more on the basis of support for and identification with Israeli democracy. On many anti-Israel resolutions introduced annually in the UN, Canada began to vote with Israel, the US, and Australia, and not with the Arab and Islamic blocs. For example, in the 2011 General Assembly Canada voted against a series of one-sided and strictly political resolution promoting "solidarity" with the Palestinians.  [12]

In October 2010, Canada lost to Portugal in a vote for a seat at the Security Council, which has been attributed by some to the Arab and Islamic bloc's effort to punish Ottawa for not supporting anti-Israel agendas at the UN.  At a conference on combating anti-Semitism in Ottawa, November 8, 2010, Canadian PM Harper said "I know, by the way, because I have the bruises to show for it, that whether it is at the United Nations, or any other international forum, the easiest thing to do is simply to just get along and go along with this anti-Israeli rhetoric (...) There are, after all, a lot more votes — a lot more — in being anti-Israeli than in taking a stand. But, as long as I am prime minister, whether it is at the UN or the Francophonie or anywhere else, Canada will take that stand, whatever the cost.

In 2016, Liberal Prime Minister Justin Trudeau announced that in 2020, Canada would seek election to the Security Council, raising concerns that in order to get support from the 57-nation Islamic bloc (the Organization of Islamic Cooperation), Ottawa would return to policies and votes for resolutions that targeted Israel.

Canadian complicity in the Arab economic boycott of Israel 
In the 1970s, the issue of Canadian complicity in the Arab economic warfare against Israel became an issue, particularly as cooperation with the boycott was illegal in the U.S., and was inconsistent with Canada's declaratory role as a global peace-maker. Ontario and Manitoba adopted anti-boycott policies, leading Prime Minister Pierre Trudeau to consider federal legislation to prohibit Canadians and Canadian companies from cooperating with the Arab economic boycott of Israel. When corporate interests dealing with Arab and Muslim opposed the legislation, fearing a backlash, Trudeau allowed the legislation to die.

Trade relations 
Canada exports agricultural products and raw materials to Israel, which, in turn, exports diamonds, textiles, clothing, and food products to Canada. On July 31, 1996, Canada and Israel signed a free trade agreement, called the Canada-Israel Free Trade Agreement (CIFTA). It came into effect on January 1, 1997. Bilateral trade subsequently increased to $1.24 billion by 2005.

In 2012, Joe Oliver, Canadian Minister of Natural Resources, and Uzi Landau, the former Israeli Minister of Energy and Water Resources, announced the creation of the Canada-Israel Energy Science and Technology Fund to spur the development of energy technologies and processes for the development of unconventional oil and gas resources. The Fund is expected to generate $20 to $40 million in collaborative research and development over a period of three years. Two Canadian R & D workshops took place in March 2013, bringing together leading Canadian and Israeli stakeholders.

In September 2019, following four years of negotiations, the updated version of CIFTA entered into force, following ratification by both governments. The new agreement included Israeli access to Canada for the sales of produce and grain products, as well as wines. Israel agreed to tariff exemptions for Canadian companies in the realm of agricultural, agri-food and fisheries products. Clauses on women's rights and gender equality in trade were also included. The volume of bilateral trade between Israel and Canada in 2018 was $1.1 billion, consisting primarily of chemical and machinery-related products, as well as medical or optical instruments.

Public opinion polls

A 2005 Gallup Poll of Canadian views on the Arab-Israeli conflict found that 34% sympathised most with Israel, 30% sympathised most with Palestinian Arabs, and 36% said they did not have sympathy for either party or had no opinion.

According to a COMPAS poll during the 2006 Lebanon War, the majority of Canadians believed Israel has a right to self-defense and Iran and Syria should not be sheltering Hezbollah, which is classified as a terrorist organisation in Canada. 45% of Canadians opposed Harper's pro-Israeli stance.  According to the COMPAS poll, 38 per cent of those polled believed Hezbollah started the war, and 35 per cent believe Israel started the war.

According to a 2013 BBC World Service Poll, 25% of Canadians view Israel as having a positive influence. An online poll, by Canada's Sun News in 2014, indicated that 72% would support Israel in a war with Iran.

In another poll conducted in 2012, 48% of Canadians supported their government favouring neither the Israelis nor the Palestinians.

A poll conducted by Canada's Forum Research after the 2014 Israel–Gaza conflict, found that 26% of Canadians support Israel, while 17% support Palestinians. Despite Canadians' support for Israel, they still remain critical of Israel's policies, as 49% believed the attack on Gaza during that summer was not justified (against 30% who think it was), 42% agreed that Israel's use of force was out of proportion, and 41% disagreed that Hamas is the only one responsible for the deaths of innocent Gazans. However, a large majority of 73% believed Hamas' rocket attacks on Israel are unjustified.

Controversies

Israeli agents working for the Mossad are widely believed to be responsible for the assassination of Gerald Bull, a Canadian engineer, in Brussels, Belgium in 1990
In September 1997, Mossad agents were apprehended by Jordanian authorities after attempting to assassinate Khaled Mashal, a senior Hamas member. They were found to have used Canadian passports as part of the assassination attempt.  Canada recalled its Ambassador to Israel in protest over the misuse of Canadian passports.
In 2008, Israeli Ambassador to Canada, Alan Baker, said he feared Canadian Muslims might impact Canada's foreign policy. He said that the Canadian Muslims might push their values onto Canadians, which "wouldn't gel with Canadian values of mutual respect." He also criticised a Muslim Member of Parliament, Omar Alghabra and said that "Muslim activists" had prevented him from speaking. Bob Rae of the Liberal party called the comments inappropriate and inaccurate and Alghabra described them as "generalizing" and "divisive." The Canadian Arab Federation accused Baker of sowing division amongst Canadians. An editorial in the Toronto Star asserted that Israeli diplomats should not "interfere in Canadian affairs".

Incidents

The Embassy of Israel in Ottawa is Israel's embassy in Canada. It is located at 50 O'Connor Street, suite 1005, in Ottawa, the Canadian capital. Israel also operates Canadian regional consulates in Montreal and Toronto. In May 2011, it was vandalised with a spray painted message which read "Embassy of War Crimes".

It was reported in October 2022 that the RCMP had downgraded security for the Embassy of Israel in Ottawa and Israeli head of mission shortly after Nimrod Barkan, the former ambassador of Israel to Canada, retired in November 2019. Officials at the Embassy of Israel in Ottawa have stated that in the current climate there is a feeling of being at risk of violence after nearly three years of pushing Global Affairs Canada to increase its security.

See also 

 Jewish Canadians
 Israeli Canadians
 List of Canadian ambassadors to Israel
 List of Israeli ambassadors to Canada
 International recognition of Israel

References

Further reading 
 

 Spitka, Timea. "Normative Canadian foreign policy towards consensus on the Israeli-Palestinian conflict." Canadian Foreign Policy Journal 27.1 (2021): 151-156.

 Wildeman, Jeremy. "Assessing Canada’s foreign policy approach to the Palestinians and Israeli-Palestinian peacebuilding, 1979–2019." Canadian Foreign Policy Journal 27.1 (2021): 62-80. online

 Wildeman, Jeremy. "The Middle East in Canadian foreign policy and national identity formation." International Journal 76.3 (2021): 359-383. online

External links 

 Government of Canada in Israel
 Canadian passport used by Israeli assassins
 Canada spies on Israel's enemies
Embassy of Israel in Ottawa
Consulate General of Israel in Toronto
Consulate General of Israel in Montreal
Personal Policy Making: Canada's Role in the Adoption of the Palestine Partition Resolution
Ministry of Foreign Affairs of Israel
 Embassy of Canada in Israel]
Ministry of Tourism of Israel
Israel21C A Focus Beyond

 
Israel
Ottawa
Israel
Bilateral relations of Israel